Hellaby is a settlement and civil parish in the Metropolitan Borough of Rotherham, South Yorkshire, England. The population of the civil parish at the 2011 census was 825. It is situated by Hellaby Brook and, whilst signposted as "Hellaby Village", the parish has no school, church or post office.

History

The name Hellaby is formed from "Helgebi", the Domesday orthography by which Norman scribes attempted to express a sound. "Helgebi" was noted in the Domesday Book of 1086 as being within the Parish of Stainton and entrusted by Roger de Busli, who was instrumental in the founding of nearby Roche Abbey, whose foundations were laid in 1147.

Although mentioned in the Domesday Book dated back nine hundred years, the ending of the name in "bi" would indicate a Scandinavian influence and settlement that would have been standing many years previous to this. "Bi" means farming land in old Norse, and so Helgebi referred to the farming land of Helge, a female name of Norse tradition.

The Humber would have proved an ideal landing point with followers of the Vikings, "helgi" and "mault" (Maltby), sailing up the Rivers Trent and Idle and establishing themselves in the nearby limestone valleys with their clear waters and fertile soil. The "Helgebi" settlement would have been built around the nearby streams with land being used for cultivation, woodland and grazing and it is doubtful whether the combined population of the two settlements would have exceeded two hundred souls.

Part of the present Hellaby Hall estate is listed with English Heritage as the deserted site of a Medieval village, with the remains of a well, square ditched enclosure, example of ridge and furrow ploughing method, post Medieval long house, corn drying oven and indications of metal working.

Located between the highway and the hall, recent excavations revealed five plots and croft remains, which could have been used for domestic use with recovered pottery sherds identifying occupation between the 10th and 15th centuries. The crafts had been constructed of freestanding, limestone blocks, infilled with rubble.

Desertion of the medieval village probably occurred in the 15th century, though it is not known for what reason. Over two thousand abandoned villages had been recorded nationally during the 14th and 15th century with varied reasons for desertion, including economic viability, change in land use, population fluctuation or as a result of widespread epidemics such as the Black Death. (This particular epidemic accounted for the death of nearly 60% of the estimated population of the Deanery of Doncaster).

As a consequence of their abandonment, many villages lay frequently undisturbed by later occupation and particularly small villages are not well represented in the archaeological record. The site here at Hellaby Hall is a rare example of such a village, which has been partially excavated and found to retain substantial remains relating to this class of listed site monument.

Whilst surrounding settlements such as Maltby developed into a township, Hellaby remained a hamlet, entirely dependent on its one estate without either a church or a public house.

Local entries noted that the original name of "Helgebi", which became Hellaby, had variations such as "helughby", and by 1379 the name along with its derivatives was spreading into neighbouring villages. In spite of this, by the time Parish Registers were introduced in 1538, the family name of Hellaby and all its variations had entirely died out.

The last of the male line was William of Hellaby, described as a cattle dealer. The fact that he paid 12d, the maximum amount of tax due, indicated his wealth and standing in the community. It was his daughter, who as heiress to the estate married John Fretwell of Braithwell, in around 1530, during the time of Henry VIII and although the Hellaby family name ended, it survived as the name of the estate and the village. The daughter died around 1560 and the lands came into the Fretwell family.

Although the Fretwell family owned the Hellaby Estate, they continued to live in the nearby village of Braithwell. The hearth tax returns of 1667 indicated that they occupied three houses in the locality. This included the vicarage at Stainton, the family home at Braithwell, which had four fireplaces and a dwelling at Hellaby with eight fireplaces. This was not the present Hall but an earlier building, probably of Tudor style and most likely built on the same site.

The man responsible for the building of the Hellaby Hall was the great-great-great-grandson of John Fretwell, Ralph Fretwell who was baptised in Sheffield on 23 June 1631.

Ralph Fretwell went to Barbados and started a sugar plantation. He became one of the pioneers who laid the foundation of British Trade and prosperity and by his industry he was granted an export licence by Charles II to export horses, bred on the Hellaby estate, to Barbados to turn the mills to crush the sugar cane and in return sugar was imported into the district through the Port of Hull. By 1700, exports from Barbados exceeded in value those of all North America together.

He named the highest mount in Barbados, which happened to be on his estate, "Hillaby Mount". He is thought to have owned a large part of Philadelphia and he was appointed Chief Justice of Court Justice of Court of Common Pleas in Barbados.

In 1671 he became a Quaker and in 1674 was removed from office because of his beliefs. Numerous prosecutions followed for allowing negroes to attend religious meetings in his house, for not paying church dues and for not carrying out Militia duties.

Ralph Fretwell returned to Hellaby around 1688 and commenced building of the present hall, farm and cottages. Completed in 1692, the Hall was designed in the Jacobean style. The doorway having an open segmental entablature on Tuscan Pilasters. Gables on each side with big, fleshy volutes rising in slopes and curves to a flat top. Three sides of the hall are built of coursed magnesium limestone from local quarries and the front, faced with Roche Ashlar.

With a Dutch impression that was influenced by the style common in the colonies, the Hall was built on a hill and hence an extra storey was required to obtain the height at the front elevation.

Ralph Fretwell did not get on well with his wife and so returned to Barbados after the Hall was finished in 1692 and died there in 1701. In the inventory of his goods at Hellaby (which accompany his will in archives at York) he left £5000 to each of his three daughters, as well as the Hellaby Estate.

The younger daughter died before the age of eleven years, the youngest, Mabel, married Dr Samuel Swyfen of Lichfield in 1710. Swynfen was the godfather of Dr Samuel Johnson and Mabel eventually became the housekeeper of Dr Johnson. The eldest daughter, Dorothy married John Pyott, and it was to her that the estate and adjoining farmlands, descended.

The daughter of Dorothy and John Pyott, also named Dorothy, married Peter Johnson, Recorder of York. They had one daughter only, named Dorothea, who became heir representative of the estate and when she married Sir John Eden of West Auckland, the Hellaby Estate came into the Eden family, the most prominent member of the family being Lord Avon, Sir Anthony Eden, former prime minister.

The Eden family had no need of Hellaby Hall as their interests were in York. Much of the original staircase and oak panelling were removed and it became a farmhouse for various tenant farmers.

For a while it was let to Samuel Clarke who was an active Methodist and the main introducer of Methodism into Maltby.

Morrell
Circa 1870–1918

The Hellaby Hall estate was sold by Sir William Eden to the Morrell family in 1870. Sir Anthony Eden, on his retirement, built a house on the Island of Barbados, only a few miles from where Ralph Fretwell's fortune had been made. The hall was again sold in 1918 to Cliff Carnelly.

Carnelly
Circa 1918–1994

Carnelly was the last resident of Hellaby Hall when he moved out in 1976 and a fire in July 1980 destroyed much of the original inside of the building. For many years it lay in disrepair whilst the owners of the time and the council determined who should be responsible for the restoration of the hall. A local company finally purchased the estate and with the guidance of English Heritage went about restoring much of the original hall as well extending the facilities to become a hotel. It only opened for three months and stayed closed for nearly four years.

On 14 August 1995 Tomorrows Leisure plc acquired Hellaby Hall.

Hellaby Hall was expanded with modern buildings, and was reopened in 1995 as a hotel. On 23 December 2015 the hotel was acquired by AJL Hotel Holdings Ltd and is now a 4 star 89 bedroomed hotel with a pool spa and large gym.

Community

Parish council
In 2011 Hellaby was split from Bramley to become a separate civil parish. A parish council was created with 5 councillors, and the first election was held on 5 May 2011.

Religion
Despite not having a parish church, Hellaby has the East Pennines Assembly hall, which serves the Jehovah's Witness community of the surrounding bay areas.

Hellaby Community Hall
There have been recent moves to sell the land where Hellaby local community hall (unused since 2007) is situated. After the 2007 closure a developer planned to demolish it. Applications for planning permission were made in 2008 and 2011.  Local residents protested as it is the last of the local facilities in the village.  Both applications were withdrawn.

Centenary Hall is now reopened to the public following a period of repair.

Sport
A short lived greyhound racing track was opened south of where Cumwell Lane meets Bateman Road on 7 April 1928. The racing was independent (not affiliated to the sports governing body the National Greyhound Racing Club) and was known as a flapping track, which was the nickname given to independent tracks. The outline of the track can still be seen from the air today, with many trees now occupying the centre of the track, despite the fact that it closed during the early 1930s.

See also
Listed buildings in Hellaby

References

External links

 
Hellaby Parish Council web site

Civil parishes in South Yorkshire
Geography of the Metropolitan Borough of Rotherham
Villages in South Yorkshire